Isabel Franco may refer to:
 Isabel Franco Sánchez, Spanish journalist and politician
 Isabel Franco Carmona, Spanish Podemos politician